Demby is a surname. Notable people with the surname include:

Albert Joe Demby (born 1934), Sierra Leonean politician and Vice President
Constance Demby (1939–2021), US musician, composer, artist
Edward Thomas Demby (1869–1957), US author and religious figure
Jack Demby (1888–1963), one of the names used by Austrian football athlete
Jamil Demby (born 1996), American football player
William Demby (1922–2013), American writer

See also
Denby (disambiguation)